Vital Idol is a remix album by English rock singer Billy Idol, released in June 1985 by Chrysalis Records. It contains remixed songs from his first two albums and the  Don't Stop EP. The album was reissued in the United States with one extra track in September 1987, peaking at number 10 on the Billboard 200. The US release was supported by a non-album live single version of "Mony Mony".

The original release, sporting a photo from the "Dancing with Myself" video, was first issued in Europe in 1985. It peaked at number seven on the UK Albums Chart, outperforming Idol's previous studio albums. The US release was expanded to feature the "Mother of Mercy Mix" of "To Be a Lover" and reissued in 1987 with different cover art, featuring a photo still from the live video for "Mony Mony" on CD.  The 1987 issue was 24-bit digitally remastered and released globally in 2002.

The album has been certified platinum by both the British Phonographic Industry (BPI) and Recording Industry Association of America (RIAA).

Background
Most of the tracks are the original 12″ extended versions, except "Catch My Fall", which features a new remix with some re-recorded instruments. "What we would always do is we knew we had certain songs where we wanted to have some space to do remixes," guitarist Steve Stevens said in 2014. "So we'd leave 16 bars or 32 bars in the middle of the song no matter what the song was and then do an edit on it later and that left us room to experiment for a dance remix."

The album's title was inspired by a 1974 single by reggae artist Horace Andy titled "Ital Vital".

Critical reception

In his review for AllMusic, Steve Huey wrote: "It doesn't really work as a hits collection, since it's missing key songs like 'Rebel Yell' and 'Eyes Without a Face,' and most of the dance remixes are repetitious and uninteresting compared to the originals." In The Rolling Stone Album Guide, Mark Coleman called the album "both a cynical recycling ploy and the essential Billy Idol album".

Track listing

Personnel
Adapted from the album liner notes.

 Keith Forsey – producer, remixing
 Gary Langan – remixing ("Flesh for Fantasy", "To Be a Lover")
 Billy Idol – remixing ("Catch My Fall")
 Steve Stevens – remixing ("Catch My Fall")
 Tom Lord-Alge – remixing ("Mony Mony" (Hung Like a Pony Mix), "Mony Mony" (Live), "Shakin' All Over")

Charts

Weekly charts

Year-end charts

Certifications

Vital Idol: Revitalized

Vital Idol: Revitalized is a remix album by English rock singer Billy Idol, released on 28 September 2018. The album has been described as a "modern-day upgrade" of Vital Idol. The digital version features four additional remixes, including a new Billy Idol and Steve Stevens remix of "Mony Mony" and "Save Me Now" (Lost Dog Remix), reworked by Idol's son, Willem Wolfe with Brandon Rauch and Ed Bedrosian.

Track listing

Release history

References

1985 remix albums
Albums produced by Keith Forsey
Billy Idol albums
Chrysalis Records remix albums